Events from the year 1982 in the United Arab Emirates.

Incumbents
President: Zayed bin Sultan Al Nahyan 
Prime Minister: Rashid bin Saeed Al Maktoum

Establishments

 Al Worood Academy.

References

 
Years of the 20th century in the United Arab Emirates
1980s in the United Arab Emirates